Samantha Mary Kerr (born 17 April 1999) is a Scottish football midfielder who plays for Rangers in the Scottish Women's Premier League (SWPL) and the Scotland national team.

Club career
Kerr played for Central Girls (previously Falkirk FC Girls) from age 12 to 16. In May 2015, she captained Graeme High School to the Scottish School Girls Cup.

Glasgow City
In January 2016, at the age of 16, Kerr signed for Glasgow City. Of her signing, Glasgow City head coach Scott Booth said, "Sam Kerr is a young player with special qualities... We are delighted she has chosen to join Glasgow City to further develop her talents as she progresses into a fantastic career in the game." In March 2016, she helped the club defeat Glasgow Girls to advanced to the semi finals of the Scottish Women's Premier League Cup. Kerr was a member of The Glasgow City squad that won the SWPL for the 10th consecutive year at the end of the 2016 season; this was the first time in Scottish football history that any senior club achieved this (no men's team amassed more than nine in a row). She also participated in more title wins in 2018, 2017 and 2019 – the 2020 season was cancelled due to the Covid-19 pandemic in Scotland – and played in the UEFA Women's Champions League, reaching the quarter-finals of the competition in 2019–20.

Rangers
In December 2020, Kerr moved to Rangers on a pre-contract arrangement agreed six months earlier (teammate Kirsty Howat made the same switch). In the 2021–22 season, she scored the first-ever goal scored by the women's team at Ibrox Stadium in a win over Aberdeen, and was named in the PFA Scotland Team of the Year as Rangers won the SWPL championship for the first time.

International career
Kerr has represented Scotland at the under-15 and under-17 levels including the group stage of the 2014 UEFA Women's Under-17 Championship. Her UEFA competition debut was on 9 October 2014 against Montenegro. Samantha has also represented Scotland at the under-19 level at The Euros and The La Manga Cup in Spain. She was added to the full Scotland squad for the first time in November 2018, and was one of two uncapped players picked for the 2020 Pinatar Cup. Kerr made her full international debut in that tournament, playing the last 13 minutes of a 3–0 win against Ukraine on 4 March.

Honours

Club
Glasgow City
 Scottish Women's Premier League: 2016, 2017, 2018, 2019
 Scottish Women's Cup: 2019

Rangers
 Scottish Women's Premier League: 2021-22,
 City of Glasgow Woman's Cup: 2022,

Individual
Scotland Player of the Year: 2022

References

External links 
 
 

1999 births
Living people
Scottish women's footballers
Glasgow City F.C. players
Rangers W.F.C. players
Scottish Women's Premier League players
Women's association football midfielders
Footballers from Falkirk
People educated at Graeme High School
Scotland women's international footballers